La Rosette is a settlement in Guadeloupe in the commune of Le Moule, on the island of Grande-Terre.  It is located to the west of Lemercier and to the south of Palais-Sainte-Marguerite.

La Rosette is the site of the Edgar Clerc Archeological Museum, which exhibits pre-Columbian artifacts which Clerc collected from the surrounding area.

References

Populated places in Guadeloupe